Dimitar Dimov Penchev (born 13 December 1937) is a Bulgarian football defender who played for Bulgaria in the 1962 FIFA World Cup. He also played for FC Spartak Plovdiv.

References

External links
FIFA profile

1937 births
Bulgarian footballers
Bulgaria international footballers
Association football defenders
FC Spartak Plovdiv players
First Professional Football League (Bulgaria) players
1962 FIFA World Cup players
Living people